The 2014 Melbourne Football Club season was the club's 115th year in the VFL/AFL since it began in 1897.

On the back of three seasons stemming back to 2011, Melbourne underwent changes to its football department in 2013. The most significant of these changes included the appointment of 2005 premiership coach Paul Roos for two seasons (with an option of a third season). It also saw the temporary appointment of former  CEO, Peter Jackson, as Melbourne's new CEO for two seasons and the appointment of former Bernie Naylor Medalist Glen Bartlett as president.

Due to Melbourne's on-field performances in recent seasons, Melbourne received a very financially challenging fixture.

Melbourne sold two of its home games into the Northern Territory due to a sponsorship deal made with Tourism NT. One was at TIO Traeger Park in Alice Springs in round 11 against Port Adelaide. This will be the first ever AFL game held at this stadium for premiership points as well as the first in Central Australia. The other game was at TIO Stadium in Darwin against  in round 16.

Despite the financially challenging fixture, Melbourne hosted a handful of blockbuster games, which included Paul Roos coaching against his old side  in round 5 for the first time. Melbourne continued to play its annual Queen's Birthday clash against Collingwood in round 12 (despite a record low crowd of 50,853 in 2013). Melbourne also hosted  for the first time since Round 11, 2009 in round 17.

2014 list changes

2013 free agency

2013 trades

Retirements and delistings

National draft

Rookie draft

2014 squad

2014 season

Pre-season

NAB Challenge

Week 1

Week 2

Practice matches

Week 3

Home and away season

Round 1

Round 2

Round 3

Round 4

Round 5

Round 6

Round 7

Round 8

Round 9

Round 10

Round 11

Round 12

Round 13

Round 14

Round 15

Round 16

Round 17

Round 18

Round 19

Round 20

Round 21

Round 22

Round 23

Ladder

Ladder breakdown by opposition

Tribunal/Match Review Panel cases

Awards

Brownlow Medal tally

Keith 'Bluey' Truscott Medal tally (top 10)

Keith 'Bluey' Truscott Trophy – Nathan Jones

Sid Anderson Memorial Trophy (Second in the Best and Fairest) – Dom Tyson

Ron Barassi Snr Memorial Trophy (Third in the Best and Fairest) – Bernie Vince

Ivor Warne-Smith Memorial Trophy (Fourth in the Best and Fairest) – Lynden Dunn

Dick Taylor Memorial Trophy (Fifth in the Best and Fairest) – Daniel Cross

Harold Ball Memorial Trophy (Best Young Player) – Dom Tyson

Troy Broadbridge Trophy (highest polling MFC player in the Casey Best and Fairest) – Max Gawn

Ron Barassi Jnr. Leadership Award – Lynden Dunn

Ian Ridley Club Ambassador Award – Jack Watts

Norm Smith Memorial Trophy (Coach's Award) – Neville Jetta

James McDonald Trophy (Best Team Man) – Daniel Cross

Leading Goalkicker Award – Chris Dawes (20)

References

External links
 Official Website of the Melbourne Football Club
 Official Website of the AFL 

2014
Melbourne Football Club